Campigneulles-les-Grandes is a commune in the Pas-de-Calais department in the Hauts-de-France region of France.

Geography
A village situated some 3 miles (5 km) southwest of Montreuil-sur-Mer on the D917 road.

Population

See also
Communes of the Pas-de-Calais department

References

Campigneulleslesgrandes